Live at the Bottom Line is a live album by American vocalist and songwriter Patti Austin recorded in 1978 and released on the CTI label.

Reception
The Allmusic review states, "There's more spontaneity, emotion, and charisma in the vocals on this album than on almost all her other releases combined".

Track listing
 "Jump for Joy" (Cynthia Biggs, Dexter Wansel) - 5:11 
 "Let It Ride" (Jermaine Jackson, Michael McGloiry, Gregory Williams) - 4:08 
 "One More Night" (Stephen Bishop) - 5:10 
 "Wait a Little While" (Eva Ein, Kenny Loggins) - 4:27 
 "Rider in the Rain" (Randy Newman) - 6:09 
 "You're the One That I Want" (John Farrar) - 3:27 Bonus track on CD reissue 
 "Love Me by Name" (Lesley Gore, Ellen Weston) - 5:16 
 "You Fooled Me" (Zane Grey, Len Ron Hanks) - 3:10 
 Spoken Introductions -  7:09 Bonus track on CD reissue
 "Let's All Live and Give Together" (Billy Osborne, Jeffrey Osborne) - 6:41

Personnel
Patti Austin - vocals
Michael Brecker - tenor saxophone
Pat Rebillot - keyboards
Leon Pendarvis, Jr. - leader, keyboards, arranger
David Spinozza - guitar
Will Lee - bass
Charles Collins - drums
Errol "Crusher" Bennett - percussion
Babi Floyd, Frank Floyd, Ullanda McCullough - backing vocals
Dave Grusin, Arthur Jenkins, Jr. - arranger
Technical
David Hewitt, David Palmer, Rudy Van Gelder - engineer
Sib Chalawick - album design
Alen MacWeeney - photography

References

1979 live albums
CTI Records albums
Patti Austin albums
Albums produced by Creed Taylor
Albums recorded at the Bottom Line